Anže Lanišek (born 20 April 1996) is a Slovenian ski jumper.

Career
Lanišek made his World Cup debut in Planica on 21 March 2014, where he finished in 34th place. He achieved his first World Cup victory on 28 November 2021 in Kuusamo, Finland.

Lanišek won gold with the Slovenian national team in the team event at the FIS Ski Flying World Championships 2022 in Vikersund. He also won bronze in the individual normal hill event at the FIS Nordic World Ski Championships 2021 in Oberstdorf.

Major tournament results

Winter Olympics

FIS Nordic World Ski Championships

FIS Ski Flying World Championships

World Cup

Standings

Individual wins

Individual starts

References

External links

1996 births
Living people
Skiers from Ljubljana
Slovenian male ski jumpers
Olympic ski jumpers of Slovenia
Ski jumpers at the 2012 Winter Youth Olympics
Ski jumpers at the 2022 Winter Olympics
Youth Olympic gold medalists for Slovenia
FIS Nordic World Ski Championships medalists in ski jumping
21st-century Slovenian people